The Ju River in North China Plain is a major river in the Beijing and Tianjin vicinities. It is a part of Hai River's watershed system. In 354 BCE (Warring States period of Zhou dynasty), State of Yan defeated State of Qi in a battle by this river. In Han dynasty, the original channel of Ju River was widened by Emperor Xian so that it became a navigable river and a major military supply line to the northeast frontier. Before paved roads were constructed in 1930s, this river was the only transportation route to and from the remote Pinggu region. The river was polluted by industrial wastewater in 1990s. The water quality has been improved in recent years and it has become a water resource for the Pinggu region.

References

Rivers of Hebei
Rivers of Tianjin